"Ball If I Want To" is a song by American rapper DaBaby, released on June 18, 2021, with an accompanying music video. It was produced by D.A. Got That Dope.

Background
The song was first previewed in a promotional video of DaBaby's performances at the Hard Rock Stadium on May 28 and 29, 2021. On June 17, he announced a "big surprise" at midnight in an Instagram video, before releasing the song.

Composition
On the track, DaBaby talks about doing what he wants; in the chorus, he raps: "Bitch, it ain't even my birthday but I can ball if I want to (Ball) / Pull up, foreign cars if I want to (Skrr) / Hop out that bitch with that iron in my jumpsuit (Go)/ Just do what I say and I love you (Okay?)" He raps about the poverty he has escaped and the current riches of his life, including private jets and sex. The instrumental of the song features an echoing choral sample.

Critical reception
Tom Breihan of Stereogum called the song a "raunchy two-minute rap attack". Glenn Rowley of Consequence writes that in the "braggadocios" track, DaBaby "unapologetically flexes".

Music video
The music video, directed by DaBaby himself, finds him leading a high school student body through a wild library study hall, a food fight in the cafeteria, a game of Twister and to the outdoor basketball courts. A cheerleading squad is seen twerking in the classroom, and at the basketball courts, a giant diapered baby mascot dances.

Live performances
DaBaby performed the song at the BET Awards 2021.

Charts

Weekly charts

Year-end charts

References

2021 singles
2021 songs
DaBaby songs
Interscope Records singles
Songs written by DaBaby
Songs written by D.A. Got That Dope